Marko Mitrušić (born 16 December 1991) is a Bosnian-Herzegovinian football defender who plays for FK Sopot.

References

External links
 
 Marko Mitrušić profile at mojklub.rs
 Marko Mitrušić stats at utakmica.rs 
 

1991 births
Living people
Footballers from Sarajevo
Serbs of Bosnia and Herzegovina
Association football defenders
Bosnia and Herzegovina footballers
FK Sopot players
FK Metalac Gornji Milanovac players
OFK Mladenovac players
FK Bežanija players
FK Donji Srem players
Serbian SuperLiga players
Serbian First League players
Bosnia and Herzegovina expatriate footballers
Expatriate footballers in Serbia
Bosnia and Herzegovina expatriate sportspeople in Serbia